Kylie Anne Stone (born 16 May 1987) is a Canadian artistic gymnast, representing her nation at international competitions.

She participated at the 2004 Summer Olympics. She competed also at world championships, including the 2003 World Artistic Gymnastics Championships in Anaheim.

References

External links
http://www.huskers.com/ViewArticle.dbml?ATCLID=223025
http://olympic.ca/team-canada/kylie-stone/

1987 births
Living people
Canadian female artistic gymnasts
Place of birth missing (living people)
Gymnasts at the 2004 Summer Olympics
Olympic gymnasts of Canada
Gymnasts at the 2002 Commonwealth Games
Commonwealth Games bronze medallists for Canada
Commonwealth Games medallists in gymnastics
Pan American Games medalists in gymnastics
Pan American Games silver medalists for Canada
Gymnasts at the 2003 Pan American Games
20th-century Canadian women
21st-century Canadian women
Medallists at the 2002 Commonwealth Games